Brenda Anellia Larry is a Malaysian Paralympic swimming athlete. She has competed in the 2020 Summer Paralympics in swimming events. Although she did not make it to the finals, she set an Asian record in the S5 women's 50m butterfly.

References

External links
 

People from Sabah
2005 births
Living people
Swimmers at the 2020 Summer Paralympics
Malaysian female butterfly swimmers
Paralympic swimmers of Malaysia
S5-classified Paralympic swimmers
21st-century Malaysian women